The 1978 Major League Baseball season saw the New York Yankees defeat the Los Angeles Dodgers to win their second consecutive World Series, and 22nd overall, in a rematch of the prior season's Fall Classic. The Yankees overcame clubhouse turmoil, a mid-season managerial change, and a 14-game mid-July deficit in the American League East en route to the championship. All four teams that made the playoffs in 1977 returned for this postseason; none of the four returned to the postseason in 1979.

Standings

American League

 The New York Yankees defeated the Boston Red Sox in a one-game playoff to earn the AL East division title.

National League

Postseason

Bracket

Awards and honors

Major Awards

Gold Glove Awards

Statistical leaders

Feats

No-Hitters
Bob Forsch, St. Louis Cardinals – April 16 vs. Philadelphia Phillies at Busch Stadium (9 IP, 3 SO, 2 BB in 5–0 win)
Tom Seaver, Cincinnati Reds – June 16 vs. St. Louis Cardinals at Riverfront Stadium (9 IP, 3 SO, 3 BB in 4–0 win)

Cycles
Andre Thornton, Cleveland Indians, April 22 at Boston Red Sox
Chris Speier, Montreal Expos, July 20 vs. Atlanta Braves
Mike Cubbage, Minnesota Twins, July 27 vs. Toronto Blue Jays

Records

American League
Most Strikeouts in a Game: 18, Ron Guidry, NYY (June 17 vs. California Angels)
Most Shutouts in a Season by a Left-Handed Pitcher: 9, Ron Guidry, NYY (tied record set in 1916 by Babe Ruth, BOS)

National League
Longest Modern Consecutive Game Hitting Streak: 44, Pete Rose, CIN (June 14 – July 31)
Most Strikeouts in a Season by a Right-Handed Pitcher: 303, J. R. Richard, HOU

Career Milestones

3,000 Hits
Pete Rose, Cincinnati Reds – May 5 vs. Montreal Expos at Riverfront Stadium (5th-inning single off Steve Rogers)

500 Home Runs
Willie McCovey, San Francisco Giants – June 30 vs. Atlanta Braves at Atlanta–Fulton County Stadium (solo home run off Jamie Easterly)

3,000 Strikeouts
Gaylord Perry, San Diego Padres – October 1 vs. Los Angeles Dodgers at San Diego Stadium (8th inning against Joe Simpson)

Home Field Attendance

Notable events

January–March
January 25 – The Texas Rangers trade pitcher Gaylord Perry to the San Diego Padres for pitcher Dave Tomlin and cash.

April–May
April 13 – Reggie Jackson hits a 3-run home run in the first inning of the New York Yankees' home opener.  Jackson is showered with "Reggie Bar" candy bars, which had been given out free to fans in attendance.  The Yankees defeat the Chicago White Sox, 4–2.
April 16 – St. Louis Cardinal Bob Forsch no-hits the Philadelphia Phillies at Busch Stadium, striking out 3 and walking 2 in a 5–0 victory.  It is the first of two no-hitters Forsch will throw in his career.
April 22 – Cleveland Indians first baseman Andre Thornton hits for the cycle in a 13–4 victory over the Boston Red Sox at Fenway Park.
May 5 – In front of a home crowd at Riverfront Stadium, Cincinnati's Pete Rose records his 3,000 career hit when he singles in the fifth inning off Montreal's Steve Rogers.
May 23 – With the Oakland Athletics in first place in the Western Division, manager Bobby Winkles resigns and is replaced by Jack McKeon, the same man he succeeded one year earlier.

June–July
June 14 – Pete Rose begins a 44-game hitting streak with 2 hits in the Reds' 3–1 win over the Chicago Cubs.
June 16 – Cincinnati's Tom Seaver throws a no-hitter against the visiting St. Louis Cardinals.  Seaver strikes out 3 and walks 3 in a 4–0 Reds' win.
June 17 – Yankees pitcher Ron Guidry strikes out an American League-record (for left handers) 18 batters in a 4–0 shutout of the California Angels.  "Louisiana Lightning" moves to 11–0 on the season.
June 30 – San Francisco Giants slugger Willie McCovey hits his 500th career home run, a solo shot off Atlanta's Jamie Easterly at Atlanta–Fulton County Stadium.  McCovey is the 12th member of the prestigious 500 home run club and the first new member since Frank Robinson in 1971.
July 11 – The National League defeats the American League, 7–3, in the All-Star Game at San Diego Stadium.  Steve Garvey earns MVP honors, and Vida Blue, the starting pitcher for the NL, becomes the first pitcher to start in the All-Star Game for both leagues.  Blue also started in 1971 and 1975 for the AL.
July 13 – Nolan Ryan of the California Angels and Steve Renko of the Boston Red Sox take no-hitters into the ninth inning of their respective games before both lose their no-hit bids.  Ryan's Angels defeat the New York Yankees, 6–1, while Renko's Red Sox shut out the Oakland Athletics, 2–0.
July 17 – In the latest incident in their tumultuous relationship, Yankees manager Billy Martin suspends Reggie Jackson for five days after accusing Jackson of ignoring signs from the dugout.  During the bottom of the 10th inning of a tie game against the Kansas City Royals, Martin gives Jackson the bunt sign.  After Jackson fails miserably on his first attempt, Martin takes the sign off, but Jackson bunts again anyway.  Jackson pops up to the catcher, Martin pinch hits for Jackson the next inning, and the Yankees go on to lose the game, 5–2.  The loss drops the Yankees 14 games behind the first-place Boston Red Sox.
July 19 – The Yankees win the first of five straight games without the suspended Reggie Jackson, defeating the Minnesota Twins, 2–0, at Metropolitan Stadium.
July 20 – Shortstop Chris Speier of the Montreal Expos hits for the cycle against the Atlanta Braves, going 4–4 with 6 RBI in a  7–3 win at Olympic Stadium.
July 24 – In Kansas City, an anguished Billy Martin announces his resignation as Yankees manager.  At the time, the defending champion Yankees are 52–42 and 10 games behind the first-place Boston Red Sox in the American League East.  Martin's resignation comes one day after he said of right fielder Reggie Jackson and owner George Steinbrenner, "The two of them deserve each other.  One's a born liar, and the other's convicted."  Bob Lemon is named manager, but third base coach Dick Howser fills in for Martin that evening against the Royals.
July 26 – Reds catcher Johnny Bench hits his 300th career home run, a 2-run shot off the Mets' Nino Espinosa at Shea Stadium.  The Reds lose, 12–3.
July 27 – Minnesota Twins third baseman Mike Cubbage hits for the cycle in a 6–3 win over the Toronto Blue Jays at Metropolitan Stadium.  Cubbage goes 4–4 with 4 RBI.
July 29 – Before an Old Timers Day crowd of 46,711, Yankee Stadium announcer Bob Sheppard reveals that Billy Martin, who resigned as Yankees manager just five days earlier, will return as manager beginning in 1980, with Bob Lemon moving to the front office as GM.  As it happens, the Yankees accelerate the timetable and Martin winds up taking over during the 1979 season.

August–September
August 1 – Pete Rose's 44-game hitting streak comes to an end in Atlanta.  Rose goes 0–4 against Braves pitchers Larry McWilliams and Gene Garber, and strikes out in the ninth inning to end the game.  Rose's streak is the second-longest in major league history, and he bats .385 (70 for 182) during the stretch.
August 20 – Los Angeles Dodgers teammates Steve Garvey and Don Sutton engage in a clubhouse brawl prior to the Dodgers' 5–4 win over the Mets at Shea Stadium.  Garvey and Sutton had been feuding for some time, but public comments by Sutton about Garvey's clean-cut image sparked the brawl.
August 25 – Major league umpires stage a one-day strike in violation of their union contract.  The league is forced to employ amateur umpires until a restraining order compels the striking umpires to return to work.
September 5 – The Montreal Expos defeat the Chicago Cubs, 10–9, in a nine-inning game that sees a major league record 45 players participate.
September 7 – 10 – The famed "Boston Massacre" occurs at Fenway Park.  The first-place Boston Red Sox enter the four-game series against the second-place New York Yankees with a four-game lead in the AL East, down from 14 just seven weeks earlier.  The Yankees pummel the Red Sox by scores of 15–3, 13–2, 7–0, and 7–4.  The Yankees outscore the Red Sox 42 to 9 during the four-game sweep and find themselves atop the division for the first time all season.
September 15 – The Los Angeles Dodgers become the first team in major league history to draw 3 million fans in a season.
September 24 – Ron Guidry of the New York Yankees ties an American League record for left-handed pitchers with his ninth shutout of the season, blanking the Cleveland Indians, 4–0.  The record was set by Red Sox southpaw Babe Ruth in 1916.
September 28 – Houston Astros pitcher J. R. Richard fans Bruce Benedict of the Atlanta Braves for his 303rd strikeout of the season, setting the National League single-season record for strikeouts by a right-handed pitcher.
September 30 – The Philadelphia Phillies beat the host Pittsburgh Pirates, their in-state rivals, 10–8, to clinch their third straight National League East title.  The Phils overcome a first-inning grand slam from Willie Stargell and winning pitcher Randy Lerch contributes two home runs to his cause.  The loss snaps the Pirates 24-game winning streak at Three Rivers Stadium.

October
October 1 – Luis Tiant throws a two-hit shutout as the Boston Red Sox defeat the visiting Toronto Blue Jays, 5–0, to close the season on an eight-game winning streak.  The win moves the Red Sox into a first-place tie and forces a one-game playoff against the New York Yankees at Fenway Park the following afternoon.
San Diego's Gaylord Perry notches his 3,000 career strikeout when he fans Joe Simpson of the Dodgers in the eighth inning of a Padres' 4–3 victory.
October 2 – Bucky Dent's three-run, seventh-inning home run off Mike Torrez puts the visiting New York Yankees ahead for good as they defeat the Boston Red Sox, 5–4, in a one-game playoff for the American League East title.  Reggie Jackson's solo home run in the eighth inning off Bob Stanley provides the winning margin.  Ron Guidry gets the win, finishing 25–3 on the season.
October 4 – Steve Garvey's two home runs pace the Los Angeles Dodgers to a 9–5 win over the Philadelphia Phillies in the opening game of the National League Championship Series.
October 6 – The Yankees overcome three home runs by the Royals' George Brett to win Game 3 of the American League Championship Series, 6–5, and take a 2 games to 1 series lead.
October 7 – The Los Angeles Dodgers win their second consecutive National League pennant over the Philadelphia Phillies, with an extra-inning 4–3 win in Game 4 at Dodger Stadium.  Ron Cey scores the winning run on Bill Russell's two-out single off Tug McGraw in the bottom of the tenth.  A walk to Cey and a routine liner that Garry Maddox muffs in center field sets up Russell's game-winner.  Dusty Baker collects four hits for the Dodgers.
The Yankees win their third straight American League Championship Series over the Kansas City Royals with a 2–1 victory in Game 4 at Yankee Stadium.  Solo home runs by Roy White and Graig Nettles account for the Yankees' runs, and Ron Guidry shuts down the Royals for the win.
October 10 – The World Series, a rematch from last season, begins at Dodger Stadium.  Davey Lopes belts 2 home runs and drives in 5 runs to lead the Dodgers to an 11–5 win over the Yankees.
October 11 – The Dodgers take a 2–0 lead in the World Series with a 4–3 win in Game 2.  The Dodgers' Ron Cey and the Yankees' Reggie Jackson drive in all the runs for their respective teams.  Bob Welch saves the win for Burt Hooton in dramatic fashion, putting two runners on before striking out Jackson for the final out.
October 13 – The World Series moves to Yankee Stadium, where the Yankees win their first game of the Series, 5–1, behind the mastery of Ron Guidry and defensive prowess of Graig Nettles.
October 14 – The Yankees even the Series with the Dodgers 2–2 when Lou Piniella's 10th-inning single scores Roy White with the winning run in a 4–3 Yankees victory.
October 15 – The Yankees move one win from clinching the World Series with a 12–2 rout of the Dodgers.  Thurman Munson drives in 5 runs and Roy White contributes 3.
October 17 – Back at Dodger Stadium, the Yankees win their 4th straight game of the Series, 7–2, and clinch their second consecutive World Series over the Dodgers.  Catfish Hunter earns the win, and Yankees shortstop Bucky Dent is named World Series MVP, batting .417 with 10 hits, 7 RBI, and 3 runs scored.

Deaths
Lyman Bostock, outfielder for the California Angels, was murdered on September 23, 1978.

References

External links
1978 Major League Baseball season schedule at Baseball Reference

 
Major League Baseball seasons